Westmoor can mean:

Westmoor, Indiana, United States, a neighborhood in the city of Fort Wayne
A common spelling of West Moor, a village in Tyne and Wear, United Kingdom
Westmoor High School, an American public high school in Daly City, California

Not to be confused with
West Moor SSSI, Somerset, a Site of Special Scientific Interest in the United Kingdom